David Clemens (born May 5, 1992) is an American soccer player who last played for Tampa Bay Rowdies 2 in the National Premier Soccer League.

Career

College and amateur
Clemens played four years of college soccer at Virginia Tech between 2010 and 2013.

While at college, Clemens also appeared for USL PDL club's Albany BWP Highlanders, Western Mass Pioneers and FC Tucson.

Professional
Clemens signed with USL Pro club Dayton Dutch Lions on January 30, 2014.

Clemens was announced on April 14, 2016, as a member of the initial roster for the Tampa Bay Rowdies' NPSL reserve side Rowdies 2.

References

External links
 Virginia Tech bio

1992 births
Living people
American soccer players
Virginia Tech Hokies men's soccer players
Albany BWP Highlanders players
Western Mass Pioneers players
FC Tucson players
Dayton Dutch Lions players
Association football midfielders
Soccer players from New York (state)
USL League Two players
National Premier Soccer League players
USL Championship players
Tampa Bay Rowdies 2 players